Gemini Trust Company, LLC (Gemini) is a cryptocurrency exchange and custodian that allows customers to buy, sell, and store digital assets. It was founded in 2014 by Cameron and Tyler Winklevoss. Currently, it operates in the United States, Canada, the United Kingdom, South Korea, Hong Kong, and Singapore.

History 
Tyler and Cameron Winklevoss announced Gemini in June 2013 and the company went live on October 25, 2015. Gemini began in order to facilitate the purchase and storage of Bitcoin through a complex system of private keys and password protected environments. Gemini holds a Limited Purpose Trust Charter from the New York Department of Financial Services that was granted in October 2015. Gemini began adding to the financial services it offers thereafter, some of which include FIX and API support. 

On May 5, 2016, Governor Andrew Cuomo of New York State announced the approval of Gemini as the first licensed Ethereum exchange based in the United States. Additionally, in 2016, Gemini announced it would allow users to withdraw Ethereum Classic (ETC) from the exchange, following a hard fork in Ethereum's code.

In October 2017, Gemini announced that it was allowing registered users to withdraw Bitcoin Cash from the exchange provided they had a balance available on the exchange prior to the Bitcoin hard fork in August 2017.

In December 2017, the Chicago Board Options Exchange (CBOE) began to use Gemini to settle its Bitcoin futures contracts. CBOE partnered with Gemini so as to use Gemini's dollar denominated auction price for these contracts. In March 2019, CBOE announced they would stop listing Bitcoin futures.

In April 2018, Gemini began offering "Block Trading". Block Trading enables Gemini users to buy and sell large quantities of digital assets outside of Gemini's continuous order books, creating an additional liquidity mechanism when trading in greater size. Also in April, Gemini began to utilize NASDAQ's SMARTS technology to monitor trades and combat fraudulent activity and price manipulation on its exchange. On May 14, 2018, the New York Department of Financial Services announced it had approved Gemini to offer Zcash (ZEC) on their platform, becoming the first licensed exchange to offer trading and custody services for it. On September 10, 2018, Gemini had received regulatory approval for a new product, the Gemini dollar (GUSD) from the NYDFS and would launch trading of the coin that same day. Gemini described the product as a stablecoin which maintains a 1-to-1 peg with the American dollar. On October 3, 2018, it was announced that Gemini had obtained digital asset insurance covering tokens and coins held on its exchange. The insurance had been brokered by Aon, a London based public risk consulting company, and underwritten by a consortium of global underwriters.

In November 2019, the Gemini Trust Co. bought Nifty Gateway for an undisclosed sum. Nifty Gateway is a marketplace for NFTs. The goal of the NFT marketplace is to be a custodian for various assets, including property deeds, passports, commodities, collectibles, videogame characters, movies, music and event tickets.

In May 2020, a partnership was announced with Samsung whereby Samsung smartphone users could link their Samsung Blockchain Wallets to their Gemini accounts to view balances and transfer crypto. 

In November 2021 Gemini raised $400 million investment that values the New York parent company, Gemini Space Station, LLC, at $7.1 billion.

On June 2, 2022, the Commodity Futures Trading Commission (CFTC) filed a suit against Gemini based on alleged misrepresentation of the company's exchange and futures contracts during 2017 meetings with the CFTC. The suit is seeking to block Gemini, as well as its affiliates, from trading commodities and getting further investments, in addition to monetary fines. Also on June 2 Cameron and Tyler Winklevoss announced they would be laying off 10% of the company staff, citing a "contraction phase" known as "crypto winter" in the cryptocurrency industry.

On January 12, 2023, the Securities and Exchange Commission charged Gemini Trust Company with the unregistered offer and sale of securities to retail investors through the Gemini Earn crypto asset lending program. As part of the same action, the SEC also charged Genesis Global Capital, a subsidiary of Digital Currency Group, which held approximately $900 million in investor assets from 340,000 Gemini Earn customers. Gemini Earn was shut down in January 2023, following Genesis suspending withdrawals in November 2022. The SEC is seeking permanent injunctive relief, disgorgement of ill-gotten gains plus prejudgment interest, and civil penalties against both Gemini and Genesis.

On February 6, 2023, Genesis Global Holdco announced an agreement in principle with Digital Currency Group and creditors of Genesis Global Capital, including Gemini. Gemini will contribute “up to $100 million in cash” as part of the restructuring and recovery agreement.

Service disruptions 
The site's primary challenge has been remaining online at times of excessively high volumes, a relatively common occurrence for any website receiving an unusual amount of traffic.  On November 28, 2017, for example, both Gemini and Coinbase crashed for several hours. Gemini was showing a "504 gateway time-out" message, and the status page showed "Systems are currently experiencing degraded performance." Subsequently, the Gemini Blog offered this comment. "This is not the first scaling challenge we’ve encountered, and it won’t be the last. We’re continuing to improve our performance and infrastructure monitoring so we can anticipate potential problems more quickly in the future."

References

External links 
 Gemini website

Bitcoin exchanges
Financial services companies established in 2015
Digital currency exchanges
2015 establishments in New York City
American companies established in 2015